The 1943 Randolph Field Ramblers football team represented the Army Air Forces' Randolph Field during the 1943 college football season. Randoph Field was located about 15 miles east-northeast of San Antonio, Texas. The team compiled a 9–1–1 record and played Texas to a 7–7 tie in the 1944 Cotton Bowl Classic on January 1, 1944.

Frank Tritico, who coached Lake Charles, Louisiana, high school teams to two state championships, was the team's head coach. His assistant coaches were Butch Morse, Leland Killian, and Walter Parker.

Glenn Dobbs was the star of the Randolph Field offense in 1943. Dobbs was the only Randolph player named to the Associated Press 1943 Service All-America team.  He also played at Tulsa and was later inducted into the College Football Hall of Fame.

Schedule

References

Randolph Field
Randolph Field Ramblers football seasons
Randolph Field Ramblers football